Eoastrapostylops is an extinct genus of astrapothere that lived during the Late Paleocene in what is now Argentina.

Description

This animal was small in size; the skull was 9 centimeters long and the total length of the animal probably just exceeded half a meter. Eoastrapostylops possessed a short muzzle ; its canines were well developed but not yet derived into large fangs, as was the case in later South American ungulates such as Trigonostylops, and the nasal bones were not retracted, indicating the absence of the typical proboscis exhibited by later forms.

The dentition of Eoastrapostylops recalls that of its later relative, Trigonostylops. molars and premolars were low-crowned and lophoselenodont-shaped. The fourth premolar was molarized, while both the fourth upper premolar and the third upper molar were triangularly shaped and lacked an hypoconus.

Classification
Eoastrapostylops riolorense was first described in 1981, based on fossils found in the Rio Loro Formation, in the Tucuman Province of Argentina. The authors immediately identified the traits of a primitive astrapothere, and therefore established the family Eoastrapostylopidae.

More recent researches have brought to light notable similarities between the auditory regions of Eoastrapostylops and those of archaic "condylarths" and litopterns. Those researches would indicate that Eoastrapostylops was one of the most basal member of the South American ungulates, and differentiated before the separation between astrapotheres, pyrothere and notoungulates.

References

M. F. Soria and J. E. Powell. 1981. Un primitivo Astrapotheria (Mammalia) y la edad de la Formación Río Loro, provincia de Tucumán, República Argentina. Ameghiniana 18(3-4):155-168
Soria, M. F. 1987. Estudios sobre los Astrapotheria (Mammalia) del Paleoceno y Eoceno. Parte I: Descripcion de Eoastrapostylops riolorense Soria y Powell, 1982. Ameghiniana 24:21–34.
Cifelli, R. L. 1993. The phylogeny of the native South American ungulates; pp. 195–216 in F. S. Szalay, M. J. Novacek, and M. C. McKenna (eds.), Mammal Phylogeny: Placentals. Springer-Verlag, New York.

Meridiungulata
Paleocene mammals of South America
Paleogene Argentina
Fossils of Argentina
Peligran
Fossil taxa described in 1981
Prehistoric placental genera